Paul K. Martin is an American lawyer and the Inspector General of the National Aeronautics and Space Administration. He was confirmed by the U.S. Senate on November 20, 2009. He was also appointed the Vice Chair of the Pandemic Response Accountability Committee on April 1, 2020 by Council of the Inspectors General on Integrity and Efficiency Chair Michael E. Horowitz, per the provisions of the Coronavirus Aid, Relief, and Economic Security (CARES) Act.

Biography 
Martin has a B.A. in Journalism from Pennsylvania State University and a J.D. from the Georgetown University Law Center. He began his career as a reporter for The Greenville News, a newspaper in Greenville, South Carolina. He joined the United States Sentencing Commission after its creation in 1985 and assisted in developing the first iteration of Federal Sentencing Guidelines. Martin spent a total of 13 years at the Commission, including six years as Deputy Staff Director. 

From 1998 to 2001, Martin was the Special Counsel to the Office of the Inspector General of the U.S. Department of Justice, and then Counsel from 2001 to 2003. He then served as Deputy Inspector General at the Department of Justice, before being confirmed by the U.S. Senate to be the NASA Inspector General on November 20, 2009. Of the balance between auditing and working with NASA, Martin has stated, "It’s sort of like straddling a barbed-wire fence." As NASA IG, Martin has advocated for improved governance of information technology security standards at the agency.

References 

American newspaper journalists
Georgetown University Law Center alumni
Living people
NASA people
Donald P. Bellisario College of Communications alumni
United States Department of Justice lawyers
United States Inspectors General by name
United States Sentencing Commission people
Year of birth missing (living people)